Miguel Grau Avenue, known locally as Grau Avenue, is one of the main avenues in the city of Piura, in Peru. It extends from east to west through the historic center and a large part of the city.

Its first blocks stand out for being an important commercial hub.

Route 

From east to west, it begins at the intersection with Tacna Jiron, in the historic center of Piura, and ends when it is intercepted by the North Pan-American Highway in the direction of the Piura bypass road.

See also 

 Piura

References 

Piura Region
Piura streets